Heriot is a small settlement in West Otago, in the South Island of New Zealand. It is located 20 kilometres southwest of Raes Junction and 15 kilometres north of Tapanui.

The township is likely not to have been named after the Scottish border town of Heriot (unlike other local towns named after Borders places, such as Kelso and Roxburgh), but may have been named from the maiden name of the wife of early settler William Pinkerton.

The main economic activities in Heriot are related to livestock and forestry.

Demographics

Heriot had a population of 111 at the 2018 New Zealand census, a decrease of 18 people (−14.0%) since the 2013 census, and a decrease of 30 people (−21.3%) since the 2006 census. There were 51 households. There were 57 males and 54 females, giving a sex ratio of 1.06 males per female. The median age was 39.8 years (compared with 37.4 years nationally), with 24 people (21.6%) aged under 15 years, 21 (18.9%) aged 15 to 29, 48 (43.2%) aged 30 to 64, and 18 (16.2%) aged 65 or older.

Ethnicities were 91.9% European/Pākehā, 13.5% Māori, and 2.7% other ethnicities (totals add to more than 100% since people could identify with multiple ethnicities).

Although some people objected to giving their religion, 48.6% had no religion, 40.5% were Christian and 2.7% had other religions.

Of those at least 15 years old, 9 (10.3%) people had a bachelor or higher degree, and 21 (24.1%) people had no formal qualifications. The median income was $31,100, compared with $31,800 nationally. The employment status of those at least 15 was that 54 (62.1%) people were employed full-time and 12 (13.8%) were part-time.

Education

The school was established in 1879.

References

Populated places in Otago